Colonel Maurice James Buckmaster  (11 January 1902 – 17 April 1992) was the leader of the French section of Special Operations Executive and was awarded the Croix de Guerre.

Apart from his war service, he was a corporate manager with the French branch of the Ford Motor Company, in the postwar years serving in Dagenham. He wrote two memoirs about his service with the Resistance during World War II.

Early life and career
Maurice Buckmaster was born on 11 January 1902 at Ravenhill, Brereton, Rugeley, Staffordshire, England, the son of Eva Matilda (daughter of R. B. Nason, M.D., of Nuneaton, Warwickshire) and Henry James Buckmaster, a company director running a brewery. He grew up at Marsham Lodge, Gerrards Cross. He was educated at Eton College.

He showed an academic bent and gained an exhibition to study Classics at the University of Oxford, but was unable to take this up as his father went bankrupt. After financial problems in early 1912, his father received orders under the "Bankruptcy Act of 1914" in June 1921.

He was allowed to stay on at Eton for a final year through a scholarship and by tutoring younger boys, and from that point onwards was entirely dependent on his own resources. After doing some teaching he made his way to France where he soon became almost fluent in the language and gained a reporter's position with the French newspaper Le Matin. Later he moved into banking for six years where, at Schroeders, he met his future wife May Dorothy Steed (born in Lima in 1904). They married in 1927 and had three children, Michael (known as Tim) in 1930, Sybil Romola (in Paris, 1933) and Mary (known as Tina) back in London in 1935. In 1929, he was employed to help establish branches of the Ford Motor Company in several European countries, eventually becoming a senior manager with the French branch of the American Ford Motor Company.  While travelling throughout France in this role he gained very considerable knowledge of the towns and the road network.

Early wartime service
When World War II broke out, Buckmaster returned to England. He joined the British Army and on 14 October 1939 was commissioned to the General List as a lieutenant (service number 101877). He joined the British Expeditionary Force and fought in France until the retreat to Dunkirk being on one of the last boats out on 2 June 1940. On his return from France Buckmaster transferred from the General List to the Intelligence Corps with effect from 15 July 1940 and was promoted to temporary captain.

Following this, he was an intelligence officer with 50th (Northumbrian) Infantry Division, which he decided to leave after the division was scheduled to move to the Middle East. He was involved in Operation Menace in September 1940, a failed attempt to seize the port of Dakar in former French territory. Following a meeting with Gerald Templer, he was recruited into Special Operations Executive (SOE), or MO1(SP).
On 20 December 1940 his services in the Battle of France and at Dunkirk were recognized and he was Mentioned in Despatches. The official record shows his rank as second lieutenant acting major.

Special Operations Executive
On 17 March 1941, Buckmaster was appointed to SOE's French section and following an attachment to T-Section, the Belgian Section, to assist Hardy Amies from July 1941, he was noted as a future head of F Section. This section recruited agents from among those Frenchmen who had not chosen to directly ally themselves with General Charles de Gaulle. A separate section of SOE, RF Section, worked with those members of the French Resistance who were clearly Gaullist in their loyalties. There was often considerable tension between F and RF sections.

In September 1941 succeeding the civilian Henry R. Marriott (a director of Courtaulds French Division), Major Buckmaster assumed command of F-Section supported by Nicholas Bodington working from an apartment in Orchard Court near Oxford Street. His task was to build an organization which could carry out sabotage and collect information about the enemy and provide money and equipment for the French resistance. Between 1941 and 1944 his organization placed 366 agents in France and set up nearly 50 networks. The office later moved to 64 Baker Street, London.

In Chelsea, London in November 1941 he married Anna Cecilia Stevenson (née Reinstein). She was the daughter of a Bavarian German hairdresser brought up in East London, and the former wife of the barrister Melford Stevenson.

At F Section Buckmaster worked closely with his assistant Vera Atkins, who was also the Section's intelligence officer and a spy mistress. During the war, the F Section handled more than 400 undercover agents, many of whom went missing. After the war, it was Atkins' task to find what happened to them, including agents she had trained. It turned out that Buckmaster had refused to believe, although showed the evidence, that their network had been compromised, thus sending many agents to their arrests and deaths for over a year, despite warnings from agents. During the war Buckmaster usually worked 16 – 18 hours per day and frequently more.

In the autumn of 1944 he was promoted to colonel and toured France giving lectures and delivering speeches in a mission based from the Hotel Cecil in Paris and known as "JUDEX" which simultaneously gave opportunity to clear up F-Section's circuits and networks.

His wartime service was recognized by an award of the OBE, unusually in the Civil Division, on 3 January 1945, Colonel Buckmaster was discreetly listed as a "Civil Assistant" at the "War Office", and a Croix de Guerre from the French.

At the end of the war Allied commander General Dwight D. Eisenhower said the section had helped shorten the war by six months. "It was the equivalent of 15 divisions," he said.
On 23 May 1947 the US Government awarded Buckmaster the Legion of Merit (Officer) which appeared in the London Gazette, he was listed as a colonel with the Intelligence Corps.

After World War II
After the war, Buckmaster rejoined the Ford Motor Company, serving in Dagenham as director of public affairs. In 1946 and 1947, he wrote a series of eight articles on F Section for the now defunct Chambers Magazine, entitled They Came By Parachute. He wrote two memoirs, Specially Employed (1952) and They Fought Alone (1958). He was interviewed for the 1969 documentary The Sorrow and the Pity.

In the official history of "SOE in France" (HMSO), a part of the series of campaign histories commissioned by the British government, author M.R.D. Foot wrote of Buckmaster: "He was a colourful and in many ways a controversial figure; he was not universally popular, but no better head for the section was ever in sight." Buckmaster was an adviser on, and appeared as himself in, the film Odette, about Odette Sansom (then Odette Churchill, later Hallowes).

Awards
 Mention in Despatches awarded on 20 December 1940.
 Médaille de la Résistance France.
 Legion d'honneur France.
 Legion of Merit (Officer) U.S. awarded 23 May 1947.
 Order of the British Empire (Civil Division) (Officer) awarded 3 January 1945.
 Croix de Guerre 1939-1945 France

References

Bibliography
 
 Michael Richard Daniell Foot, SOE in France. An account of the Work of the British Special Operations Executive in France, 1940–1944, London, Her Majesty's Stationery Office, 1966, 1968 ; Whitehall History Publishing, in association with Frank Cass, 2004. Official History of SOE in Europe..
 André Gillois, L'Histoire secrète des Français à Londres, Le Cercle du nouveau Livre, Librairie Jules Taillandier, 1973.

 

1902 births
1992 deaths
People from Brereton, Staffordshire
People educated at Eton College
British Army General List officers
British Army personnel of World War II
British Special Operations Executive personnel
French Resistance
Recipients of the Croix de Guerre 1939–1945 (France)
Officers of the Legion of Merit
Officers of the Order of the British Empire
Recipients of the Resistance Medal
Ford people
People from Forest Row